Csaba Gercsák (born 19 August 1988 in Budapest) is a Hungarian long-distance swimmer and Olympic participant, who won the bronze medal at the 2011 World Aquatics Championships in the 25 km open water event.

He has swum for Hungary in:
 Olympics: 2008, 2012
 World Championships: 2005, 2007, 2009, 2011
 Open Water Worlds: 2006, 2008

Awards and recognition
 Hungarian Long Distance Swimmer of the Year: 2007, 2008, 2009, 2010

References

External links
 Profile at the Southern Illinois University Salukis official website
 

1988 births
Living people
Swimmers from Budapest
Hungarian male swimmers
Hungarian male freestyle swimmers
Male long-distance swimmers
Olympic swimmers of Hungary
Swimmers at the 2008 Summer Olympics
Swimmers at the 2012 Summer Olympics
Southern Illinois Salukis men's swimmers
World Aquatics Championships medalists in open water swimming
20th-century Hungarian people
21st-century Hungarian people